The Metropolitan Area Express, or MAX, was a bus rapid transit (BRT) line owned by the Regional Transportation Commission of Southern Nevada and operated by MV. MAX began operations on June 30, 2004. The area served extended between the Downtown Transportation Center and North Las Vegas.

Following changes instituted on February 21, 2016, the Metropolitan Area Express (MAX) no longer operates, with additional services added to the route 113.

The route ran on a 12-minute frequency during the day, 20 minutes at night using only 10 vehicles purchased from Irisbus in France. These vehicles could hold a passenger load of 131 passengers. All fare payment were done off the vehicle at the stations. Special ticket vending machines were at every station where passengers had to pay fare before boarding as there was no fare box on board. Once on board, fare enforcement officers were at hand to check bus passes which are issued by the TVM upon payment.

The BRT service was chosen by the RTC over light rail service due in part to costs of building and maintaining light rail. The RTC felt it was better to operate rubber tire transit rather than to have an expensive light rail system that would be too much to operate.

Safety record
All operators that drove MAX vehicles were required to have two years of preventable-free service. This means that a driver could not have had a preventable incident or accident for two years while driving for RTC Transit, the fixed route system also owned by the RTC and operated by MV. Then, operators were taken through training once again to be "MAX Certified".

Expansion/ACE BRT

After 4 years of service, MAX moved forward with expansion. In August 2007, the RTC hosted a groundbreaking ceremony for the new ACE BRT system, which was supposed to replace the MAX BRT system, using a new type of vehicles (MAX used Iribus Civis, ACE would use Wright StreetCar RTV) and new station designs. The first ACE line was named ACE Downtown Connector and would travel from the World Market Center, Downtown Las Vegas, Las Vegas Convention Center, Las Vegas Strip, before finally terminating at McCarran Airport. Construction was completed sometime mid-2009 with operations starting in fall 2009.

During construction for this route, construction was scheduled to begin on ACE Boulder Highway which would travel from Downtown Las Vegas, down Boulder Highway into Downtown Henderson. The RTC was looking at even further expanding, with planned ACE route studies on North 5th Street, Sahara Avenue, Tropicana Avenue, Flamingo Road, and Maryland Parkway.

In March 2008, the pavement was completed on Grand Central Parkway, northbound from Bonneville to F Street, with the colored cement bus lane in the middle of the road. Construction then proceeded on Grand Central south of Bonneville. Also by March 2008, a few of the new ACE buses were already built.

In February 2009, construction was completed on Grand Central Parkway, with the exception of the station themselves. Construction was still ongoing along Casino Center Boulevard and 3rd St. The route was set to use a dedicated lane from Grand Central to Imperial/3rd St. From that point, it was to operate in mixed flow travel, with special stations built along the route, terminating at the South Strip Transfer Terminal.

References

External links
Official page for ACE Rapid Transit

Transportation in the Las Vegas Valley
Bus rapid transit in Nevada
2004 establishments in Nevada
2016 disestablishments in Nevada